Smaller were an English alternative rock, Britpop band from Liverpool, active during the 1990s. They had hits with "Wasted" and "Is" in 1996 and 1997.

History
The band was formed in the early 1990s by former Cook da Books guitarist/singer Peter "Digsy" Deary, his brother Steven  (drums), Jason Riley (guitar/vocals), and Paul Cavanagh (bass guitar). The band's debut release was the single "God I Hate This Town" in 1995. They recorded a session for John Peel's BBC Radio 1 show in November that year. A second single failed to chart, but they broke into the UK top 75 with "Wasted" in September 1996. Their next single, "Is", which featured Noel Gallagher on guitar, gave them their biggest hit, reaching number 55 in the UK in March 1997. The band's debut album, Badly Badly, was released in April 1997, featuring further contributions from Gallagher. A second album was recorded, featuring a guest appearance from Richard Hawley, but it remained unreleased, various members of the band left and were replaced by friends of the Smallers - Lee Watson on guitar and Chris Mullin on bass joined 1999, drummers Bren Moore & Chris Campbell came along later and the transition from Smaller to The Sums happened in 2005.

The band's lyrical themes included relationships, financial problems, and Digsy's experiences with drugs.

Digsy went on to front The Sums.

Discography

Albums
Badly Badly (1997) No. 86

Singles
"God I Hate This Town" (1995) No. 141
"Stray Dogs and Bin Bags" (1996) No. 160
"Wasted" (1996) No. 72
"Is" (1997) No. 55

References

External links
 
 

Musical groups from Liverpool
English alternative rock groups
Britpop groups